Elise Mertens and Mandy Minella were the defending champions, but neither player chose to participate.

Valeria Savinykh and Maryna Zanevska won the title, defeating Chloé Paquet and Pauline Parmentier in the final 6–0, 6–2.

Seeds

Draw

External Links
Main Draw

Open de Limoges - Doubles
Open de Limoges